The European liquidation of American securities in 1914 (also called the financial crisis of 1914) was the selloff of about $3 billion (equivalent to $ billion in ) of foreign portfolio investments at the start of World War I, taking place at the same time as the broader Crisis of 1914. Together with loans to finance the Allied War effort, made by J.P. Morgan and others, the liquidation of European-held securities transformed the United States from a debtor nation to a creditor nation for the first time in its history.

When Britain declared war on Germany on August 4, 1914, global stock exchanges were non-functional after days of massive selloffs. American banker Frank A. Vanderlip wrote to his wife:

You can not possibly have any conception of what has happened to the world. Civilization has broken down, and there is the most absolute derangement of a great part of our affairs.

After several consecutive days of sell offs Treasury Secretary William Gibbs McAdoo closed the New York Stock Exchange on July 31. For four months the stock market remained closed to prevent the sale of British-held American securities. As the leading financial superpower in 1914 Britain was under tremendous pressure to maintain its gold payments. McAdoo was determined to keep pace but his ambitions were hampered by a Federal Reserve System still in its infancy. During the course of the crisis McAdoo distributed gold to treasury offices to protect the dollar and intervened in the near bankruptcy of New York City. On August 3, while the stock market was still closed, he increased the supply of paper money to avoid a run on the banks that would force them to suspend deposit convertibility, as they had in the Panic of 1907.

References

Economic crises in the United States
Economic history of Europe
20th-century economic history
Financial crises
1914 in economics
1914 in Europe
1914 in the United States